Alexander Waibel (born 2 May 1956 in Heidelberg, Germany) is a professor of Computer Science at Carnegie Mellon University and Karlsruhe Institute of Technology. Waibel's research interests focus on speech recognition and translation and human communication signals and systems. Waibel is known for the time delay neural network (TDNN), which he developed. It is the first convolutional neural network (CNN) trained by gradient descent, using the backpropagation algorithm. Alex Waibel introduced the TDNN 1987 at ATR in Japan.

BBC summed up Alex Waibel's motivation: "We don’t want to look things up in dictionaries – so I wanted to build a machine to translate speech."

Life 
He graduated from Massachusetts Institute of Technology, and Carnegie Mellon University.

Dr Waibel is the director of interACT, the International Center for Advanced Communication Technologies. He was one of the founders of C-STAR, an international consortium for speech translation research, and served as its chairman from 1998 to 2000. Waibel directed the CHIL program  (FP-6 Integrated Project on multimodality) in Europe and NSF-ITR project STR-DUST (the first domain independent speech translation project) in the U.S. He is project coordinator of the IP EU-BRIDGE, funded by the EC and started on 1 February 2012.

At C-STAR, his team developed the JANUS speech translation system, the first American and European Speech Translation system, and more recently the first real-time simultaneous speech translation system for lectures. His lab has also developed a number of multimodal systems including perceptual meeting rooms, meeting recognizers, meeting browsers and multimodal dialog systems for humanoid robots.

In the areas of speech, speech translation, and multimodal interfaces Dr. Waibel holds several patents and has founded and co-founded several successful commercial ventures. He is the founder and chairman of Mobile Technologies, LLC, maker of the Jibbigo mobile speech-to-speech translation app which uses speech recognition and machine translation.

In 2012, Waibel produced a video lecture demonstrating the world's first automatic simultaneous translation service at a university, stating that "the lecture translator automatically records, transcribes and translates the speech of a lecturer in real time, and students can follow the lecture in their own language on their PC or mobile phone."

In 2013 he joined Facebook, INC to start the Language Technology Group which would eventually become part of Facebook's broader Applied Machine Learning efforts. He is a director at Multimodal Technologies, Inc.

In 2017 Dr. Waibel was elected as member of the Academy of Sciences Leopoldina, the national academy of Germany.

In October 2018 Dr. Waibel closed out a successful legal case against Wikimedia Foundation citing German libel laws.

References

External links 
 Urteil im Fall Waibel, Wikimedia Foundation, 12 September 2018
 A German court forced us to remove part of a Wikipedia article’s ‘history.’ Here’s what that means. Wikimedia Foundation, 11 April 2019 

Living people
American computer scientists
German computer scientists
1956 births
Members of the German Academy of Sciences Leopoldina